Parahepialus is a monotypic moth genus in the family Hepialidae described by Zhi-Wen Zou, Xin Liu and Gu-Ren Zhang in 2010. Its only species, Parahepialus nebulosus, was described by Sergei Alphéraky in 1889 and is known from the Tibet Autonomous Region in China.

References

Hepialidae
Monotypic moth genera
Moths of Asia